In mathematics, a quasiperfect number is a natural number n for which the sum of all its divisors (the divisor function σ(n)) is equal to 2n + 1. Equivalently, n is the sum of its non-trivial divisors (that is, its divisors excluding 1 and n). No quasiperfect numbers have been found so far.

The quasiperfect numbers are the abundant numbers of minimal abundance (which is 1).

Theorems 
If a quasiperfect number exists, it must be an odd square number greater than 1035 and have at least seven distinct prime factors.

Related 
Numbers do exist where the sum of all the divisors σ(n) is equal to 2n + 2:  20, 104, 464, 650, 1952, 130304, 522752 ... . 
Many of these numbers are of the form 2n−1(2n − 3) where 2n − 3 is prime (instead of  2n − 1 with perfect numbers). In addition, numbers exist where the sum of all the divisors σ(n) is equal to 2n − 1, such as the powers of 2.

Betrothed numbers relate to quasiperfect numbers like amicable numbers relate to perfect numbers.

Notes

References 
 
 
 
 
 
 

Arithmetic dynamics
Divisor function
Integer sequences
Unsolved problems in mathematics